Kristina Dmitruk (born 25 September 2003) is a Belarusian tennis player.

She has a career-high singles ranking by the Women's Tennis Association (WTA) of 244, achieved on 7 November 2022.

Dmitruk won the girls' doubles titleat the 2021 Wimbledon Championships.

ITF finals

Singles: 6 (2 titles, 4 runner–ups)

Doubles: 4 (3 titles, 1 runner-up)

Junior career

Grand Slam performance
Singles:
 Australian Open: –
 French Open: QF (2020)
 Wimbledon: QF (2021)
 US Open: F (2021)

Doubles:
 Australian Open: –
 French Open: QF (2020)
 Wimbledon: W (2021)
 US Open: QF (2021)

Junior Grand Slam finals

Singles: 1 runner-up

Doubles: 1 title

References

External links
 
 

2003 births
Living people
Belarusian female tennis players
Grand Slam (tennis) champions in girls' doubles
Wimbledon junior champions
21st-century Belarusian women